The following highways are numbered 588:

United States
Maryland
 
 
 
 

Territories
  Puerto Rico Highway 588